The BICh-20 Pionyer was a tailless research aircraft designed and built in the USSR from 1937.

Development 
Chyeranovskii's smallest aircraft was the BICh-20 Pionyer, following broadly similar lines to its predecessors, the airframe was constructed of wood with a low aspect ratio tapered wing carrying suspended ailerons and flaps at the trailing edge. The engine and pilot were accommodated in the central nacelle with the cockpit canopy forming the leading edge of the broad chord fin and rudder. 
Flight tests were carried out, with ski undercarriage from early 1938, to investigate the turning performance of the tailless designs, particularly in flat horizontal flight without banking. Tests demonstrated turns up to 35 deg while the wings remained horizontal. The initial 18 hp Blackburne Tomtit was replace with a 20 hp Aubier-Dunne in the latter half of 1938

Specifications (BICh-20 Aubier-Dunne)

See also

References

 Gunston, Bill. “The Osprey Encyclopaedia of Russian Aircraft 1875 – 1995”. London, Osprey. 1995.

External links

 http://www.ctrl-c.liu.se/misc/RAM/bich-20.html

1930s Soviet experimental aircraft
1930s Soviet sport aircraft
BICh-20
Aircraft first flown in 1938